St Brigid's GAA Club (Irish: Cumann Naomh Bríd) is a Gaelic Athletic Association club based in Castleknock, Fingal, Ireland which serves Castleknock, Clonsilla, Blanchardstown and Corduff. Its main grounds are at Russell Park, and it also has grounds in Castleknock at Beech Park and College Fort. The club supports 70 teams, from nursery level (four- to seven-year-olds) to adults, in hurling, football, camogie, women's football, handball and badminton.

In 2003, St Brigid's GAA won their first Dublin Senior Football Championship and Leinster Senior Club Football Championship. The club won their second Dublin Senior Football Championship in 2011, but lost the year's Leinster Final to Garrycastle in an injury-time free goal.

St Brigid's senior hurlers lost the 2003 Senior A Hurling final to Craobh Chiarán and the 2019 final to Cuala. The team lost in the semi-finals in 2011 and 2013. St Brigid's senior hurlers won the Senior B and AHL 2 League titles in 2010 and 2014. The club has rivalries with the Castleknock GAA and Oliver Plunketts/Eoghan Ruadh GAA clubs. Dual All Ireland Handball Senior Singles champion Eoin Kennedy is a club member.

In 2007, Justin McNulty was manager. In 2013, Tony McEntee was appointed as manager of the St Brigid's senior football team, succeeding Gerry McEntee and Mark Byrne.

Jack Chambers, who served as Minister for Sport from 2020, is a member of the club.

Honours 

 1958: Dublin Intermediate Football Championship
 1979: Dublin Junior Hurling League Division 2 champions
 1976: Dublin Intermediate Hurling League and Dublin Intermediate Hurling Championship
 1980: Dublin Intermediate Football champions
 1986: Dublin Intermediate A Camogie champions
 1988: Loving Cup Intermediate Football and Murphy Cup winners
 1990: Dublin Under-16 Football and Hurling League champions
 1991: Dublin Under-15 Football championship
 1993: Dublin Minor Football Premier League champions
 1994: Dublin Under-16 and Minor Football Premier League champions
 1995: Dublin Under-16 and Minor Football champions
 1996: Dublin Under-15, Ladies Under-14 and Under-18 champions and Camogie Under-14 Feile winners
 1997: World, All-Ireland and Leinster handball champions, Dublin Junior 5 Football League Sheridan Cup, Dublin Under-16 Football Championship, Dublin Minor B Football Championship, Dublin Ladies Football Under-16 and Under-18 Championships, Dublin Under-15 Hurling Shield and Dublin Under-10/11/12/12/14 football and hurling league champions
 1998: Dublin Under-11 League Division 1, St. Vincent de Paul Senior Football League, and Dublin Minor B Football Shield champions
 1999: Dublin Under-12 League Division 1 champions, Dublin Under 21 Football Championship, Dublin Senior Football League Division 1 champions, Dublin Under 15-B Hurling Championship, Dublin Intermediate Camogie Championship, Under-16 South/West Region Football Championship, Dublin Minor Ladies Football Championship
 2000: Dublin Under-13 League Division 1 champions, Dublin Junior Hurling Championship, Dublin Ladies Football Minor Championship, Ladies Football Under-16 Championship
 2001: Dublin Under-14 League Division 1, Under-14 Dublin Feile Division 1, and Under-14 All-Ireland Feile Division 1 champions
 2002: Dublin Under-12 Football Championship, Dublin Under 15 Juvenile Hurling Championship, and Dublin Under-16 A and B League champions
 2003: Dublin Minor Hurling Championship, Dublin Senior Football Championship, Leinster Senior Club Football Championship, Dublin AFL Division 8 champions, Dublin Junior C Football Championship, Dublin Junior C Football Championship
 2004: Dublin Under-11 and Under-12 Ladies Football champions and Dublin Junior 3 Football League title
 2005: Ladies Dublin Intermediate Championship, Dublin Junior Hurling Championship, Dublin Intermediate Football Championship, Dublin Minor Football Championship, Dublin Senior Football League Division 1 Champions
 2006: Dublin Junior B Football Championship, Stacey Cup and Dublin AFL Division 6 winners
 2007: Dublin AFL Division 5 winners
 2008: Dublin Junior A Hurling Championship
 2009: Barney McGarrell Perpetual Cup winners, Dublin and Leinster Ladies Football Champions
 2010: Dublin Junior A Football Championship, Dublin Senior Football League Division 2 champions, Dublin Intermediate Football Championship, Dublin Minor C Hurling Championship
 2011: Dublin Minor B Hurling Championship, Dublin Senior Football Championship
 2012: Dublin Senior 2 and Senior 7 Camogie championships
 2013: Dublin AHL 5 League Hurling and Dublin Senior Football League Division 1 champions
 2014: Dublin Minor B hurling and football champions

Notable players

Senior inter-county men's footballers
Dublin
 Peadar Andrews
 Kevin Bonner
 Paddy Andrews
 Barry Cahill
 Declan Lally
 Sean Murray
 Graham Norton
 Shane Supple
Laois: John O'Loughlin 
Leitrim: Emlyn Mulligan

Senior inter-county hurlers
Dublin
 Alan Nolan
 Daire Plunkett
 Andrew Dunphy
 Cian O'Sullivan

Handball players
Dublin: Eoin Kennedy

Senior inter-county ladies' footballers
Dublin: Noëlle Healy

Others
Sarah Hawkshaw: Ireland women's national field hockey team

References

External links
St Brigids GAA Club
Road to 2003 Leinster Final

Castleknock
Gaelic games clubs in Fingal
Gaelic football clubs in Fingal
Hurling clubs in Fingal